John Calley was a film producer.

John Calley may also refer to:

John Calley (engineer)
John Calley, character in News of the World (film)

See also
John Caley, archivist
John Callie, rower
John Kelley (disambiguation)